The 1840 United States presidential election in Michigan took place between October 30 and December 2, 1840, as part of the 1840 United States presidential election. Voters chose three representatives, or electors to the Electoral College, who voted for President and Vice President.

Michigan voted for the Whig candidate, William Henry Harrison, over Democratic candidate Martin Van Buren. Harrison won Michigan by a narrow margin of 4.14%. This was the only time Michigan voted for a Whig Party candidate.

Results

See also
 United States presidential elections in Michigan

References

Michigan
1840
1840 Michigan elections